Dornoch is a town, seaside resort, parish and former royal burgh in the county of Sutherland in the Highlands of Scotland. It lies on the north shore of the Dornoch Firth, near to where it opens into the Moray Firth to the east.

The town is within the Highland local government council area. The town is near the A9 road, to which it is linked by the A949 and the B9168. The town also has a grass air strip suitable for small aircraft and helicopters.

History
The name 'Dornoch' is derived from the Gaelic for 'pebbly place', suggesting that the area contained pebbles the size of a fist (dorn) which could therefore be used as weapons. Archaeological excavations during the development of a new business park in 1997 revealed a building, evidence for ironworking and part of a whale, dating from 8th through the 11th centuries AD. The archaeologists surmised that the findings are of an industrial area on the edge of a settlement and that a settlement existed from at least the 8th century at Dornoch. However, the first direct reference to a settlement in Dornoch is not until the early 12th century when David I, recorded in the Dunfermline Abbey register, orders Rognvald, the Earl of Orkney, to respect the monks at Dornoch.

Dornoch has the thirteenth-century Dornoch Cathedral, the Old Town Jail, and the previous Bishop's Palace which is now the well-known hotel, Dornoch Castle and a notable golf course, the Royal Dornoch Golf Club, named the 5th best golf course outside the United States in 2005 by Golf Digest.

It is also notable as the last place a witch was burnt in Scotland. Her name was reported as Janet Horne; she was tried and condemned to death in 1727. There is a stone, the Witch's Stone, commemorating her death, inscribed with the year 1722. The golf course designer Donald Ross began his career as a greenkeeper on the Royal Dornoch links. The golf course is next to the award-winning blue flag beach.

Dornoch used to be connected to the main railway network at The Mound by a light railway. The railway was opened on 2 June 1902. Stations on the line were Dornoch, Embo, Skelbo, Cambusavie Halt and The Mound Junction. The stations were shut on 13 June 1960.

Dornoch Academy Modern Languages teacher Margaret C. Davidson, led the National Union of Women's Suffrage Societies in the burgh from 1913, volunteered as a nurse in the Scottish Women's Hospitals in France in World War One, and returned to teach and serve as a Girl Guide leader in 1931.

On 21 December 2000, the pop star Madonna had her son Rocco christened in Dornoch Cathedral, the day before her wedding to Guy Ritchie in nearby Skibo Castle.

On 13 January 2005, Dornoch was granted Fairtrade Town status.

The Burghfield House Campus of the University of the Highlands and Islands in Dornoch is the home for the Centre for History teaching undergraduate and postgraduate history degrees to students around the UHI network and worldwide.

Governance
Dornoch was a parliamentary burgh, combined with Dingwall, Kirkwall, Tain and Wick in the Northern Burghs constituency of the House of Commons of the Parliament of Great Britain from 1708 to 1801 and of the Parliament of the United Kingdom from 1801 to 1918. Cromarty was added to the list in 1832.

The constituency was a district of burghs known also as Tain Burghs until 1832, and then as Wick Burghs. It was represented by one Member of Parliament (MP). In 1918 the constituency was abolished and the Dornoch component was merged into the then new county constituency of Caithness and Sutherland.

Scotland's Westminster constituencies were redrawn for the 2005 UK general election, when Dornoch became part of the new Caithness, Sutherland and Easter Ross constituency. Since 2017, the MP has been Jamie Stone of the Liberal Democrats.

In the Scottish Parliament, since 2011 Dornoch has been part of the Caithness, Sutherland and Ross constituency. It elects one Member of the Scottish Parliament (MSP) by the first past the post method of election. Since its creation, the constituency has been held by the Scottish National Party (SNP).   the MSP is Maree Todd, who was first elected in May 2021.

It is also one of eight constituencies in the Highlands and Islands Scottish Parliament region, which elects seven additional members, in addition to eight constituency MSPs, to produce a form of proportional representation for the region as a whole.

There is also elected local government councillors, and as of November 2011 there are elected community councillors.

Dornoch in popular culture
Rosamunde Pilcher's last novel Winter Solstice is largely set in and around Dornoch, fictionalised under the name of Creagan.

References

 
Populated places in Sutherland
Royal burghs
County towns in Scotland
Seaside resorts in Scotland
Towns with cathedrals in the United Kingdom
Towns in Highland (council area)